The kacapi is a traditional zither of Sundanese people in Indonesia. This musical instrument is similar to Chinese , Japanese koto, the Mongolian , the Korean , the Vietnamese  and the Kazakh jetigen. The kacapi played as the main accompanying instrument in the Tembang Sunda or Mamaos Cianjuran, kacapi suling (tembang Sunda without vocal accompaniment) genre (called kecapi seruling in Indonesian), pantun stories recitation or an additional instrument in Gamelan Degung performance.

The word kacapi in Sundanese also refers to santol tree, from which initially the wood is believed to be used for building the zither instrument.

Form

According to its form or physical appearance, there are two kinds of kacapis:
Kacapi Parahu (=Boat Kacapi) or Kacapi Gelung; and
Kacapi Siter

The Kacapi Parahu is a resonance box with an uncovered underside to allow the sound out. The sides of this kind of kacapi are tapered inward from top to bottom, which gives the instrument a boat-like shape. In ancient times, it was made directly from solid wood by perforating it.

The Kacapi siter is a plan-parallel resonance box. Similar to the kacapi parahu, its hole is located at the bottom. The upper and bottom sides of it form a trapezium-like shape.

For both kinds of kacapi, each string is affixed to a small screw or peg on the top right-hand side of the box. They can be tuned in different systems: pelog, sorog/madenda, or slendro.

Nowadays, the resonance box of kacapi is made by gluing six wood-plates side by side.

The kacapi is traditionally played by sitting cross-legged on the floor. Thus, the strings are about 25 cm above the floor. Nowadays the kacapi is sometimes placed on a wooden frame, so that the player can sit on a chair. If the kacapi indung is played while sitting on the floor, usually a pillow or some other small object is placed under its left-hand side, as seen from the player, so that the sound can freely escape through the resonance hole in the bottom of the soundbox. Some kecapi are fitted with small feet, so that it is not necessary to lift them in this way.

Functions

According to its functions in a musical accompaniment, the kacapi is played as:
Kacapi Indung (=mother kacapi); and
Kacapi Anak (=child kacapi) or Kacapi Rincik

The Kacapi indung leads the accompaniment by providing intros, bridges, and interludes, as well as determining the tempo. For this purpose, a large kacapi with 18 or 20 strings is used. 

The Kacapi rincik enriches the accompaniment by filling in inter-note spaces with higher frequencies, especially in fixed metered songs as in the kacapi suling or Sekar Panambih. For this purpose, a smaller kacapi with ~15 strings is used.

Tuning and notation
Kacapi uses degung notation. It is a subset of the pelog heptachordal system. See the following table.

The note range, from the lowest to the highest frequency is:

The kacapi is tuned to match the 60 cm length suling tones. With this length, an approximation for the tuning compared to western scale is:

The following picture applies the above-mentioned tuning and notation.

Physical dimensions

Recitation of pantun stories
It is not certain how long the kacapi has been used to accompany the recitation of pantun stories. In the Sundanese dictionary published by the Lembaga Basa & Sastra Sunda (1976) the primary meaning of the word pantun is given as kacapi. This may be an indication that the relation between the kacapi and the recitation of pantun stories is an old one. Eringa (1949:3) points to the proverb "kawas pantun teu jeung kacapi", 'like a pantun(-singer) without a kacapi', used of someone who likes to give other people advice but who does not himself practise what he preaches. This proverb, according to Eringa, indicates that the kacapi is the Standard instrument for accompanying a pantun recitation. The Baduy Sundanese of Banten Province still make exclusive use of the kacapi to accompany their pantun stories.

References

External links
 

Indonesian musical instruments
Box zithers
Sundanese culture
Music of West Java